Huggett/Goodwood Field Aerodrome  is a registered aerodrome located  northwest of Huggett, Alberta, Canada.

References

Registered aerodromes in Alberta
Leduc County